Warren's Opera House is a historic building in Friend, Nebraska. It was built by John Lanahan for Joshua Warren in 1885–1886. Inside, there is an auditorium with a proscenium and a balcony supported by four columns. It hosted performances by "touring stock companies; comic opera; companies; musical concerts; dialect comedies" as well as local performers and Memorial Day celebrations. The building has been listed on the National Register of Historic Places since September 28, 1988.

References

1885 establishments in Nebraska
Commercial buildings completed in 1885
National Register of Historic Places in Saline County, Nebraska
Opera houses on the National Register of Historic Places in Nebraska